Martin Page (born 1975) is a French writer.

He is the author of the bestselling novel, How I Became Stupid, which won the Euroregional schools’ literature prize, an award given by Belgian, Dutch and German students.

Bibliography

Novels 

 How I Became Stupid (Comment je suis devenu stupide) (2000), 
 Une parfaite journée parfaite (2002), 
 La libellule de ses huit ans (2003), 
 On s'habitue aux fins du monde (2005), 
 The Discreet Pleasures of Rejection (Peut-être une histoire d'amour) (2008), 
 La disparition de Paris et sa renaissance en Afrique (2010), 
 La mauvaise habitude d'être soi (2010), illustrated by Quentin Faucompré, 
 La nuit a dévoré le monde (2012), with pseudonym Pit Agarmen, 
 L'apiculture selon Samuel Beckett (2013), 
 Je suis un dragon (2015), with pseudonym Pit Agarmen, 
 L'art de revenir à la vie (2016),

Young adult novels 

Flora et Max series, with Coline Pierré:
 La folle rencontre de Flora et Max (2015), 
 Les nouvelles vies de Flora et Max (2018), 

Stand-alones:
 Traité sur les miroirs pour faire apparaitre les dragons (2009), 
 Le club des inadaptés (2010), 
 Plus tard, je serai moi (2012),

Children's novels 

 Le garçon de toutes les couleurs (2007), 
 Je suis un tremblement de terre (2009), 
 Conversation avec un gâteau au chocolat (2009), illustrated by Aude Picault, 
 Le zoo des légumes (2013), illustrated by Sandrine Bonini, 
 La première fois que j'ai (un peu) changé le monde (2018),

Young adult short stories 

 "L'invention d'un secret" (2007), collected in Juke-box

Children's books 

Picture books:
 La bataille contre mon lit (2011), illustrated by Sandrine Bonini, 
 La recette des parents (2016), illustrated by Quentin Faucompré, 
 Le permis d'être un enfant (2019), illustrated by Ronan Badel,

Comics 

 Le banc de touche (2012), with Clément C. Fabre, 
 Tu vas rater ta vie et personne ne t'aimera jamais (2012), 
 16 ways to get a boner (2013)
 If diseases were desserts (2013)

Poems 

 24 putain de poèmes de Noël (2021), collection of 24 poems
 Un accident entre le monde et moi (2022), collection of poems,

Non-fiction 

Essays:
 De la pluie (2007), 
 Manuel d'écriture et de survie (2014), 
 La charité des pauvres à l'égard des riches (2015), illustrated by Quentin Faucompré, 
 Les animaux ne sont pas comestibles (2017), 
 Au-delà de la pénétration (2020), 

Self help:
 N'essayez pas de changer : le monde restera toujours votre ennemi (2018), illustrated by Coline Pierré, 

Epistolary:
 Nous avons des armes et nous ne savons pas nous en servir (2011), with Jakuta Alikavazovic,

Adaptations 

 Comment je suis devenu stupide (2004), comic by Nicolas Witko, based on novel How I Became Stupid
 Maybe a Love Story (2018), film directed by Rodrigo Bernardo, based on novel The Discreet Pleasures of Rejection
 The Night Eats the World (2018), film directed by Dominique Rocher, based on novel La nuit a dévoré le monde
 Le club des inadapté.e.s (2021), comic by Cati Baur, based on novel Le club des inadaptés

Sources
http://www.powells.com/cgi-bin/biblio?isbn=9780142004951&atch=h&atchi=158346812
http://www.tower.com/details/details.cfm?wapi=100555497

References

External links

 
 Monstrograph (in French)
 
 
 

Living people
1975 births
French male novelists
21st-century French male writers
21st-century French writers
21st-century French novelists
21st-century French essayists
French children's writers
French-language writers
People in veganism